Eiffel (French Eiffel Constructions métalliques) is part of the Eiffage group and the descendant of the engineering company Société des Établissements Eiffel founded by Gustave Eiffel, designer of the Eiffel Tower.

Notable structures
 Budapest-Nyugati Railway Terminal completed in 1877
 Eiffel Bridge, Ungheni, completed in 1877
 Statue of Liberty (Liberty Enlightening the World) completed in 1878
 Garabit viaduct completed in 1884
 Colbert Bridge completed in 1888
 Eiffel Tower completed in 1889.
 Jiu Bridge, completed in 1897
 Tancarville Bridge completed in 1955.
 Louvre Pyramid completed in 1989.
 Normandy bridge completed in 1995.
 The Living Bridge completed 2007
 Millau Viaduct completed in 2002.
 Simone-de-Beauvoir foot bridge completed in 2006.
 It assisted with the construction and support of the glass wall of Columbia University's Alfred Lerner Hall, the largest in North America completed in 1999.

References

External links
Eiffel website (in French)

Construction and civil engineering companies of France
Gustave Eiffel
Companies based in Île-de-France
Construction and civil engineering companies established in 1866
French companies established in 1866